Kenny Bruce may refer to:

Kenny Bruce, co-founder of Purplebricks, a UK based online estate agents
Kenny Bruce Williams, fictional character in the Left Behind novel series by Tim LaHaye

See also
Ken Bruce (born 1951), broadcaster on BBC Radio 2 in the UK

 

Larne FC